Donald E. Gavit Jr./Sr. School (Gavit) was a public secondary school located in Hammond, Indiana. Part of the School City of Hammond district, it graduated its final class in the spring of 2021.

Demographics
The demographic breakdown of the 1,619 students enrolled for the 2017-2018 school year was:

African American - 38.7%
Hispanic - 38.3%
Multiracial - 3.6%
Caucasian - 19.1%

In addition, 78.7% of the students qualified for free or reduced lunch.

See also
 List of high schools in Indiana

References

External links
Official website

Public high schools in Indiana
Schools in Lake County, Indiana
2021 disestablishments in Indiana